Richard Cattell (1871–1948) was a rugby union international who represented England from 1895 to 1900, and also captained his country. He was also a priest in the Church of England.

Early life
Richard Cattell was born on 23 March 1871 in Erdington. He was educated at Trinity College, Stratford-upon-Avon and Exeter College, Oxford. He was a rugby blue in 1893.

Rugby union career

Cattell played two games for Leicester Tigers on their Easter tour to Wales in 1890. He played against Cardiff and Newport on Monday 7 April 1890 and Tuesday 8 April 1890 respectively.  Along with Abel Ashworth he became the first future England international to play for Leicester.

Cattell made his international debut on 5 January 1895 at St Helen's, Swansea in the Wales vs England match.
Of the 7 matches he played for his national side he was on the winning side on 3 occasions.
He played his final match for England on 6 January 1900 at Kingsholm, Gloucester in the England vs Wales match.

Ordination
He was ordained an Anglican clergyman in 1897 before becoming the vicar of St Michael, Berkhamsted. During World War I, from 1915, he served as a chaplain to the forces (4th class). From 1923 to 1928 he was rector of Watlington, Norfolk, and from 1928 served as rector of Warham, Norfolk, until his death.

References

1871 births
1948 deaths
20th-century English Anglican priests
Alumni of Exeter College, Oxford
England international rugby union players
English rugby union players
Leicester Tigers players
Rugby union fly-halves
Rugby union players from Birmingham, West Midlands
World War I chaplains